Dead and Gone to Heaven is the debut EP by Canadian rock act Rose Chronicles. It was released on 28 September 1993 by Nettwerk Records.

Track listing 
 All songs written by Cochrane/Maranda/Thirsk/Van Der Woerd.

 "Awaiting Eternity" (5:26)
 "Echo of Angels" (2:44)
 "Hollow Sea" (3:53)
 "Clouding Doubt" (6:11)
 "Dead and Gone to Heaven" (3:37)

Personnel

Rose Chronicles 

 Richard Maranda - Guitars
 Judd Cochrane - Bass
 Steve van der Woerd - Drums and Percussion
 Kristy Thirsk - Voice and Words

Guest musicians 

 Peggy Lee — Cello on Awaiting Eternity and Clouding Doubt
 Anthony Cecil — Didgeridoo on Dead And Gone To Heaven

Production 

 Produced by Mark Jowett and Rose Chronicles
 Engineered and mixed and edited by Greg Reely
 Assistant engineering by Pete Wonziak
 Recorded at Mushroom Studios, Desolation Sound Studios, Slack Studios
 Mastered by Stephen Marcusen
 Mastered at Precision Sound.

Rose Chronicles albums
1993 debut EPs